The Jaguar AJ-V6 engine is based on the Ford Duratec V6 engine. 
(The Duratec V6 was originally a Porsche design, purchased by Ford with Cosworth finishing the engineering to suit Ford's needs.)
One notable addition is the use of variable valve timing, a feature also shared with Mazda's version of the engine.

Jaguar's AJ-V6 engine has an aluminium engine block and Jaguar designed aluminium DOHC cylinder heads. It uses sequential fuel injection, has 4 valves per cylinder with VVT, features fracture-split forged powder metal connecting rods and a one-piece cast camshaft and has direct-acting mechanical bucket (DAMB) tappets, these design aspects differentiating the AJ-V6 from the Ford and Mazda versions.

AJ20
The AJ20  version has an  bore and stroke. The compression ratio is 10.75:1.

This engine is used in the following vehicles:
 Jaguar X-Type 2.0 (UK)

AJ25
The AJ25 is a  version built.

This engine is used in the following vehicles:
 2001-2009 Jaguar X-Type 2.5,  and 
 2002-2006 Jaguar S-Type 2.5 (UK),  and

AJ30
The AJ30 is a  version and is the most common, especially considering the Duratec 30. It has an  bore and shares the 2.5's  stroke. The Jaguar XF debuted a refined version of the AJ30 with continuously variable cam-phasing and variable geometry air intakes to increase power and broaden the powerband up to its 6800 rpm redline.

This engine is used in the following vehicles:
 2000-2008 Jaguar S-Type,  and 
 2002-2009 Jaguar X-Type,  and 
 2003-2010 Jaguar XJ, 237 hp (177 kW; 240 PS) and 
 2008-2011 Jaguar XF  and 
 2000-2006 Lincoln LS

See also
 Ford Duratec V6 engine
 Jaguar AJ-V8 engine

References

AJ-V6
Gasoline engines by model
V6 engines